Classic Masters may refer to:
Classic Masters (April Wine album), 2002
Classic Masters (Blind Melon album), 2002
Classic Masters (Crowded House album), 2003
Classic Masters (General Public album), 2002
Classic Masters (Grand Funk Railroad album), 2002
Classic Masters (Queensrÿche album), 2003
Classic Masters (Sammy Hagar album), 2002